The Robinson Helicopter Company, based at Zamperini Field in Torrance, California, is a manufacturer of civilian helicopters. Robinson produces three models  – the two-seat R22, the four-seat R44, both of which use Lycoming piston engines, and the five-seat R66, which uses a turbine engine.

History

The company was founded in 1973 by Frank Robinson, a former employee of Bell Helicopter and Hughes Helicopters. Since delivering its first helicopter in 1979, Robinson Helicopter has produced over 12,000 aircraft. Robinson helicopter will celebrate 50 years in business in June 2023.

Plans for production of the Robinson R66 were announced in March 2007.

In 2013, Robinson was the global market leader, selling 523 light helicopters, a 1% increase from 2012. Production in 2014 dropped to 329 aircraft. In 2015, Robinson produces one R22, four or five R44s, and one or two R66s per week, and has contracted with Rolls-Royce to supply 100 RR300 turbines per year for 10 years for the R66. The factory can produce up to 1,000 helicopters per year.

Products 

 Robinson R22
 Robinson R44
 Robinson R66

Robinson also produces the Robinson Helipad, a modular helipad designed for light helicopters.

Mast-bumping controversy 
Mast bumping is a dangerous condition helicopters can encounter when load on the helicopter's rotor assembly is temporarily reduced during flight (for example, during a low-g maneuver or turbulent weather). The reduction of load triggers excessive flapping in the helicopter's rotor blades, which can cause the entire rotor assembly to shear off the aircraft.

Robinson helicopters use a patented design for their main rotor, with a triple-hinged rotor assembly "teetering" atop an extended mast. Several Robinson helicopters have been destroyed in incidents where mast bumping was determined to have occurred. A May 2018 article in the Los Angeles Times reported Robinson helicopters seemed to have increased susceptibility to mast-bumping incidents.

In 2016, the New Zealand Transport Accident Investigation Commission (TAIC) released a report summarizing 14 mast-bumping accidents or incidents involving Robinson helicopters in New Zealand, in which 18 people died. The TAIC report noted "Helicopters with semirigid, two-bladed main rotor systems, as used on Robinson helicopters, are particularly susceptible to mast bumping in "low-G" conditions".

In 2018, a U.S. lawsuit accused the Robinson Helicopter Company of defective manufacturing after a mast-bumping event caused the in-flight breakup of an R66 helicopter.

Crashes of Robinson helicopters have killed 176 people to date.

References

External links

 Robinson Helicopter Company website

Helicopter manufacturers of the United States
Manufacturing companies based in Greater Los Angeles
Companies based in Torrance, California